The Glacier Point Hotel was a historic 80-room chalet-style hotel built on the grounds of Glacier Point overlooking Yosemite Valley, California, adjacent to the McCauley Mountain House. It was known as the venue for the Yosemite Firefall spectacle. The hotel opened in 1918, and was taken over by the Yosemite Park & Curry Company in 1924. The building was severely damaged by snowfall in winter 1968-69, and was still empty when it was destroyed in a fire in July 1969.

History
Built 3,274 feet above the valley floor, the Glacier Point Hotel opened in 1918 and provided magnificent views of Half Dome and  Yosemite Valley. Both housing units were constructed from 1916 to 1917 by The Desmond Park Service Company and Gutleben Brothers contracting firm. In 1920 DJ Desmond over extended the finances of his company and the firm was reorganized By ABC Dohrmann and Larry Harris, prominent San Francisco businessmen,  as the Yosemite National Park Company.  In 1924 at the insistence of the gov't, the Curry Company and the Yosemite National Park Company were required to merge their assets and contracts and the hotel's ownership was transferred to the newly formed Yosemite Park & Curry Company.

The hotel consisted of two housing units with a combined total of 80 available rooms. A dining room, lounge area, and other facilities were located within the main complex. Also situated within the back of this building was the well-known viewing porch. Here, visitors would often spend several hours reclining and admiring the landscape. Next to the hotel was James McCauley's old Mountain House. In the years following the opening of the hotel, the Mountain House was used for employee housing and put into service as a public cafeteria. Although the Glacier Point Hotel was in an excellent location, it still struggled as a business. High room costs would continually leave several rooms vacant, but this would slowly change as the hotel gained favor with the increasing numbers of tourists. Water was always a problem at Glacier Point. Some summers the hotel was closed in August due to insufficient water.

Winter was always a tough time for the establishment. Snow was very frequent in the area, and due to the light construction of the buildings, maintenance workers were often needed to live within the hotel, their primary job to keep snow off the roofs so they would not collapse under the weight. 

For many years, the guests of the Glacier Point Hotel would witness and participate in the Yosemite Firefall. What was once a summer event would gradually become daily routine. At 9:00 every night, hotel employees would push burning embers off Glacier Point to fall 3,000 feet down and mark the end of a performance at Camp Curry on the valley floor. As the coals fell in a set pattern, the resulting shower would closely resemble a burning waterfall. This tradition would continue on and off from 1872 until the last firefall on Thursday, January 25, 1968.

Calamities 
During the winter of 1968 and 1969, the hotel, along with the McCauley Mountain House, were severely damaged by snowfall. Repairs were later needed and applied to the structures. In the meantime, no guest reservations were booked, and the employees used the Mountain House to sell snacks to Glacier Point visitors.  

On July 9, 1969, an electrical fire started on the bottom floor of the unoccupied hotel. Within minutes, the Glacier Point Hotel, along with the Mountain House and several trees, was destroyed. A nearby stockpile of Red Fir left over from the firefall helped feed the flames. After the incident, visitors were kept away from Glacier Point as demolition crews removed the remaining debris. 

YPCC considered rebuilding a hotel at Glacier Point, but the Park Service would not permit rebuilding at the same location; it would have to be placed further back from the precipice.

Aftermath 
The next summer the Yosemite Park and Curry Company built a small snack shop to serve daytime visitors to Glacier Point.  In later years, a granite amphitheater was built on the site of the hotel, and a new visitor center was completed nearby. These changes were part of a 1996-1997 modernization effort to transform the heavily traveled path. Even so, some evidence of the Glacier Point Hotel, such as some of the old foundations, are still evident. The iconic boulder behind the hotel has also remained in its original position.

See also
 Yosemite Firefall
 Glacier Point
 Many Glacier Hotel

References

Bibliography
 Radanovich, Walter. Yosemite National Park and Vicinity. Arcadia Publishing, 2006

External links
 Yosemite Lodging Options in 1920
 McCauley's Glacier Point Mountain House
 HABS—Historical American Engineering Record: Glacier Point Road

Buildings and structures in Yosemite National Park
Demolished hotels in California
Demolished buildings and structures in California
Hotel buildings completed in 1918
Buildings and structures demolished in 1969
1918 establishments in California
1969 disestablishments in California
Shingle Style architecture in California